Edward Maddin (May 15, 1852 – August 15, 1925) was a United States Navy sailor and a recipient of the United States military's highest decoration, the Medal of Honor.

Biography
Born on May 15, 1852, in Newfoundland, Maddin joined the Navy from Massachusetts. On that morning, while Franklin was at Lisbon, Portugal, Landsman Henry O. Neil fell from the ship's lower boom into the water and was swept away by a strong tidal current. Maddin and another sailor, Seaman John Handran, jumped overboard and kept Neil afloat until a boat could be sent to their assistance. For this action, both Maddin and Handran were awarded the Medal of Honor a month later, on February 15.

Maddin's official Medal of Honor citation reads:
Serving on board the U.S.S. Franklin at Lisbon, Portugal, 9 January 1876. Displaying gallant conduct, Maddin jumped overboard and rescued one of the crew of that vessel from drowning.

See also

List of Medal of Honor recipients during peacetime

References

External links

1852 births
1925 deaths
People from Newfoundland (island)
Canadian emigrants to the United States
United States Navy sailors
United States Navy Medal of Honor recipients
Canadian-born Medal of Honor recipients
Non-combat recipients of the Medal of Honor